Jitendra Karkiis a footballer from Nepal. He plays for Nepal Army Club in Martyr's Memorial A-Division League.

International
He made his first appearance for the Nepal national football team in 2012.

References 

Living people
Nepalese footballers
Nepal international footballers
Association football defenders
Place of birth missing (living people)
1987 births